Dartmouth Park is a district of north west London in the Borough of Camden,  north of Charing Cross. The area adjoins Highgate and Highgate Cemetery (to the north) and Kentish Town (to the south). Parliament Hill is to the west.

The nearest Underground stations are Tufnell Park and Archway, both on the Northern line. The nearest Overground station is Gospel Oak.

History
Dartmouth Park is named after the Earl of Dartmouth who bought the land in St Pancras parish in the middle of the 18th century, for the relative position of which see Ossulstone Hundred. The 5th Earl of Dartmouth allowed a wave of scrutinised house building in the late 19th century, with most later waves also subject to amenity-giving planning conditions and/or restrictive covenants, such as a limitation on density.

By then the need to increase the supply of fresh water to serve London's growth meant that water companies were building new facilities. Two covered reservoirs were constructed on Maiden Lane (since renamed Dartmouth Park Hill) in 1855 by the New River Company and connected to its new waterworks and pumping station by Stoke Newington reservoirs, two boroughs to the east. Later owned by the Metropolitan Water Board, the reservoirs are now owned by Thames Water Utilities.

Geography

Land use and housing
Dartmouth Park is an overwhelmingly residential district. It has a relative (inherently housing-related) emphasis on housing those with middle-to-higher incomes and, by Inner London standards, the retired. Immediately north is the Holly Lodge Estate and then Highgate. Dartmouth Park is separated from Kentish Town to the south by the Gospel Oak to Barking (railway) line. Housing is predominantly detached, terraced and semi-detached houses, late Victorian and Edwardian mansion flats (notable examples include Brookfield Mansions and the blocks in Lissenden Gardens), and some post war housing such as Haddo House.

Parks
The former park demesne is reflected by Waterlow Park and Highgate Cemetery.

A small, landscaped park, Dartmouth Park, is immediately to the east in Islington, adjoining Dartmouth Park Hill. It was laid out on the edge of the reservoirs and opened to the public in 1972. Much of it is taken up by the reservoir tank. It has a children's playground. The top of the slope gives an open semi-panorama. The park has an enclosed seating area surrounded by a hedge, which local children helped to plant in 1991. The park hosted one of the beacons lit nationwide on 21 April 2016 to celebrate Queen Elizabeth II's 90th birthday.

Landmarks
The Anglican church is St Mary Brookfield, designed by William Butterfield and opened in 1875. It is red brick with contrasting yellow and blue brick patterns.

The street named York Rise, bisects the district, forming a gentle vale taken up by the Fleet stream then one of the successive Fleet combined sewers, each intercepted by Joseph Bazalgette's great interceptor sewers, before doing so crossing the railway tracks in a visible large iron pipe.

Notable residents

Julian Barnes, novelist
Benedict Cumberbatch, actor and film producer, and his wife, theatre director Sophie Hunter
Hunter Davies, writer
Glenda Jackson, Labour MP
Ed Miliband, former Labour party leader and his wife Justine Thornton, environmental lawyer
Richard D'Oyly Carte, opera impresario
Dave Lee Travis, former Radio 1 DJ
Lucy Rose, folk musician 
Paul Smith, television writer
Vas Blackwood, actor
Paco Peña, Flamenco guitarist
Noel Fielding, actor and comedian

Past residents
Margaret Forster, novelist and biographer
Geoffrey Jellicoe, architect
Ken Loach, the film director
Nova Pilbeam, actress
Denny Wright, jazz guitarist

Transport

Nearest places
 Archway
 Gospel Oak
 Hampstead Heath
 Highgate
 Kentish Town
 Tufnell Park

Nearest stations
 Gospel Oak
 Tufnell Park
 Archway

References

 The Buildings of England London 4: North. Bridget Cherry and Nikolaus Pevsner. .

Areas of London
Districts of the London Borough of Camden
Legge family